The 1986–87 NBA season was the Warriors' 41st season in the NBA and 24th in the San Francisco Bay Area.

In the playoffs, the Warriors defeated the Utah Jazz in five games in the First Round, before losing to the eventual NBA champion Los Angeles Lakers in five games in the Semi-finals.

Draft picks

Roster

Regular season

Season standings

z - clinched division title
y - clinched division title
x - clinched playoff spot

Record vs. opponents

Game log

Playoffs

|- align="center" bgcolor="#ffcccc"
| 1
| April 23
| @ Utah
| L 85–99
| Joe Barry Carroll (18)
| Joe Barry Carroll (9)
| Sleepy Floyd (8)
| Salt Palace11,376
| 0–1
|- align="center" bgcolor="#ffcccc"
| 2
| April 25
| @ Utah
| L 100–103
| Joe Barry Carroll (22)
| Larry Smith (12)
| Sleepy Floyd (9)
| Salt Palace12,095
| 0–2
|- align="center" bgcolor="#ccffcc"
| 3
| April 29
| Utah
| W 110–95
| Terry Teagle (30)
| Larry Smith (17)
| Sleepy Floyd (8)
| Oakland–Alameda County Coliseum Arena15,025
| 1–2
|- align="center" bgcolor="#ccffcc"
| 4
| May 1
| Utah
| W 98–94
| Purvis Short (32)
| Larry Smith (8)
| Sleepy Floyd (11)
| Oakland–Alameda County Coliseum Arena15,025
| 2–2
|- align="center" bgcolor="#ccffcc"
| 5
| May 3
| @ Utah
| W 118–113
| Joe Barry Carroll (24)
| Larry Smith (14)
| Sleepy Floyd (14)
| Salt Palace11,071
| 3–2
|-

|- align="center" bgcolor="#ffcccc"
| 1
| May 5
| @ L.A. Lakers
| L 116–125
| Joe Barry Carroll (22)
| Larry Smith (7)
| Larry Smith (11)
| The Forum17,505
| 0–1
|- align="center" bgcolor="#ffcccc"
| 2
| May 7
| @ L.A. Lakers
| L 101–116
| Joe Barry Carroll (22)
| Larry Smith (13)
| Sleepy Floyd (12)
| The Forum17,505
| 0–2
|- align="center" bgcolor="#ffcccc"
| 3
| May 9
| L.A. Lakers
| L 108–133
| Joe Barry Carroll (23)
| Larry Smith (15)
| Sleepy Floyd (12)
| Oakland–Alameda County Coliseum Arena15,025
| 0–3
|- align="center" bgcolor="#ccffcc"
| 4
| May 10
| L.A. Lakers
| W 129–121
| Sleepy Floyd (51)
| Larry Smith (16)
| Sleepy Floyd (10)
| Oakland–Alameda County Coliseum Arena15,025
| 1–3
|- align="center" bgcolor="#ffcccc"
| 5
| May 12
| @ L.A. Lakers
| L 108–116
| Purvis Short (20)
| Larry Smith (23)
| Sleepy Floyd (11)
| The Forum17,505
| 1–4
|-

Player statistics

Season

Playoffs

Awards and records

Transactions

Free agents

References

See also
 1986-87 NBA season

Golden State Warriors seasons
Golden
Golden
Golden State